Kreon is a fictional character featured in comic books published by DC Comics. He is a Green Lantern from the world of Tebis. Physically, he is a tall, well-muscled humanoid alien with orange-tinted skin and blonde hair. Other distinguishing characteristics are golden prosthetics in place of his right hand and left eye. He first appeared in Green Lantern (vol. 3) #22 (March 1992).

Fictional character biography

Early history
A warlord, General Kreon sought to end wars in Tebis rather than start them. He had seen the horrors of war and indeed had lost an eye and an arm in his service to the military.

His beliefs about war were in complete contrast to that of his race: the Chietain, a militaristic warrior race. His race glorified war and the domination of other races. Their race was also far more advanced than earth in terms of technology. They had used advanced space travelling ships to invade Space Sector 3319. They saw this as necessary; their stronghold on the Sector 3316 planet Hwagaagaa had been lost due to a rebellion led by a Green Lantern.

Seeking to end his race's bloodlust and to end the wars for good, he bought Star Sapphire from a local thug called Flicker. However she could not be controlled and soon slaughtered over a dozen men before she was subdued. While his fellow chieftains demanded he kill her, Flicker suggested there was a way to control her. Taking his advice, he tried to get her old lover Green Lantern Hal Jordan and his fellow Lanterns from the dealer. With the promise of ending the long-standing war, he mistakenly trusted Flicker, but neither the Lanterns nor Star Saphire could be contained, and it led to even more bloodshed.

Shunned by his fellow Chieftains because of his lack of strength and the destruction his failed plan had wrought, he caught the eye of Hal Jordan. Impressed and seeing his potential, Hal Jordan recruited Kreon for the Green Lantern Corps.

Green Lantern of Sector 2002

When Hal introduced Kreon to the Corps he was taken in by Kilowog who trained him along with his fellow Lanterns. Kilowog was known as the more level headed of the trainers. Unlike Ke'Haan, Kilowog often told the rookies stories of past Lanterns to show them they were a part of a proud and historic group. Among his fellow rookies, Kreon had a particular dislike for Boodikka, who he saw as barbaric and lacking in discipline. This led to the many problems, as they were paired together to defend Oa. Still, both became renowned. As sides were being taken among fellow Lanterns, and smaller groups began to be established, they were paired together once again.  Their disagreements with each other eventually endangered the protection of the guardians. This became even more apparent during the Qwardian invasion.

Kilowog was worried about this problem between two of his most respected students. He feared that it could lead to a breakdown of teamwork among his other students. Thus, he called John Stewart to give them a 'pep talk' on tolerance. While the two could not be taught to like each other by Gardner, he instead decided to use his Power Ring's telepathy to have them confront their fears. It was at this point that Kreon made poignant revelation. The Chieftains appear to consider females incapable of learning the discipline necessary for military duty. Then, the psychic projection of Kreon's worst fear appeared, in the form of a demonic female. In turn, his teammate Boodikka was fighting a psychic construct representative of her fear: being controlled. While she belittled Kreon for his inability to defeat his opponent, she herself could not best hers. Realizing that they finally needed each other, they switched opponents and arose victorious. Having learned much about each other, they understood Gardner's 'trial' and broke off from the rest of the trainees for some privacy.

The two would work together again on many missions, including against the incarnation of Entropy on Oa. They would also fight together against the Triarch, Darkstars and L.E.G.I.O.N. on the planet Malus to help his friend, none other than Hal Jordan.

Emerald Twilight and death

Kreon was now renowned among the Green Lantern Corps. At one point, he was described as one of the greatest and most decisive war leaders in the  universe. His signature trait as a Green Lantern was that his ring never showed a beam; his constructs were simply "on" and "off", suggesting that his mind apparently moved quite fast.

He was a fierce warrior, despite missing a hand and an eye. One day, Kreon was called to Oa to defend the planet from Hal Jordan. He was defeated in a brutal battle with Jordan and left for dead.

Recently he was discovered by Jordan and Guy Gardner to be held captive by the Manhunters, along with the other Lost Lanterns. The other Lost Lanterns included Arisia, Boodikka, Laira, Graf Toren, Ke'Haan, Hannu, Jack T. Chance and Tomar-Tu, who had all recently escaped to kill Jordan in revenge for his rampage. Among his fellow captives was his longtime rival/partner Boodikka as well. When his fellow Lanterns are about to kill Jordan, his is the voice of reason who stayed their hand. He is slain fighting the forces of the ancient enemies of the Green Lanterns, the Manhunters. He dies in Boodikka's arms. His ring, upon his death, chose her as his successor.

Blackest Night

Kreon is one of the many fallen Lanterns to be risen from his grave on Oa to become a Black Lanterns. He is one of the many Black Lanterns beginning a stand against the living Green Lanterns on Oa.

See also
Arisia
Laira
Graf Toren
Boodikka
Tomar-Tu
Ke'Haan
Jack T. Chance
Emerald Twilight
Green Lantern Corps

References

Comics characters introduced in 1992
DC Comics aliens
DC Comics extraterrestrial superheroes
DC Comics superheroes
Characters created by Pat Broderick
Green Lantern Corps officers